The Bös Fulen is a mountain in the Schwyz Alps, located on the border between the cantons of Schwyz and Glarus. It overlooks the valleys of Muotathal (Schwyz) and Linthal. It is the highest summit of the canton of Schwyz. Politically, it is split between the municipalities of Muotathal (Schwyz) and Glarus. Braunwald is the nearest locality.

See also
List of mountains of Switzerland

References

External links
Bös Fulen on Hikr

Mountains of the Alps
Mountains of Switzerland
Highest points of Swiss cantons
Mountains of the canton of Glarus
Mountains of the canton of Schwyz
Glarus–Schwyz border
Two-thousanders of Switzerland